The European Car of the Year ("ECOTY") award is an international Car of the Year award established in 1964, by a collective of automobile magazines from different countries in Europe. The current organising companies of the award are Auto (Italy), Autocar (United Kingdom), Autopista (Spain), Autovisie (Netherlands), L'Automobile Magazine (France), Stern (Germany) and Vi Bilägare (Sweden).

The voting jury consists of motoring journalists from publications throughout Europe. Representation from each country is based on the size of the country's car market, and car manufacturing industry. There are no categories or class winners — the stated objective is to find a "single, decisive winner" among all competing cars.

The 2023 ECOTY was announced on 13 January, 2023, in Brussels, Belgium, the winner being the Jeep Avenger.

Current rules
Eligible cars are new models released in the twelve months prior to the award. The award is not restricted to European cars, but nominees must be available in at least five European countries, and have expected sales of 5,000 a year.

Nominees are judged on the following criteria: design, comfort, safety, economy, handling, performance, functionality, environmental requirements, driver satisfaction and price. Technical innovation and value for money are also important factors.

A shortlist of seven cars is selected by a simple vote. For the final round of voting, each jury member has 25 points to distribute among the finalists. The points must be distributed to at least five cars, with no more than ten to any one car, and no joint top marks. The voting is open, and each jury member provides published justification for their vote distribution.

Under these rules, the decisiveness of the victory has varied greatly. For example, in 1988, the Peugeot 405 won by 212 points, the biggest gap in the history of the European Car of the Year competition; such feat was repeated in 2013, as the Mk VII Volkswagen Golf won by the same points gap. In 2010 the Volkswagen Polo won by a mere 10 points, received maximum points from twenty-five jurors, and was the top choice of 59.

The Renault Clio (1991, 2006), Volkswagen Golf (1992, 2013), Opel/Vauxhall Astra (1985, 2016), and Toyota Yaris (2000, 2021) are the only cars to have won the award more than once.

In 2011, the Nissan Leaf was the first electrically-powered vehicle to be awarded Car of the Year.

Result
British carmakers produced the first two winners of the award. The Rover 2000 saloon was the inaugural winner in 1964 while the Austin 1800 was victorious in 1965. The Rover won over another British contender, the rear-engine Hillman Imp.

The Renault 16 was the world's first production hatchback car  and unsurprisingly won the award for 1966, having been launched at the beginning of 1965. A year later, the award went to the Fiat 124, which won more than twice as many as voted as its nearest competitor, the BMW 1600. Fiat missed out the following year, however, when its 125 was pipped to the award by the revolutionary new NSU Ro80, one of the first production cars to feature a rotary engine.

Peugeot claimed the accolade for the first time with the 1969 award, which was won by its 504 saloon, a large family car which offered a high standard of interior comfort and build quality. The Fiat 128 was the next winner of the award, while a year later the innovative new Citroën GS family saloon won the award.

Fiat became the first manufacturer to win the award for a third time when its 127 supermini won the 1972 title. The next winner of the award was the Audi 80, and the 1974 award went to the Mercedes-Benz 450SE luxury saloon.

Despite financial problems which led to its takeover by Peugeot that year, Citroën won the accolade in 1975 with its flagship CX saloon, which fought off a strong challenge from the highly acclaimed Volkswagen Golf. Then came Chrysler Europe's first winner of the award, the contemporary Simca 1307/1308 (Chrysler Alpine in the United Kingdom). Despite all the strife which troubled British Leyland throughout the 1970s, the state-owned carmaker achieved recognition for 1977 when its Rover 3500 executive car won the award.  This was the last time a British marque would win the contest (discounting the Vauxhall models which were badge engineered Opels) - until the Jaguar I-Pace took the crown in 2019.

Sports cars have traditionally accounted for only a tiny percentage of car sales throughout Europe, but the European Car of the Year accolade was won by one for 1978, when the Porsche 928 sealed the award in the face of competition from the BMW 7 Series and Ford Granada.

Just before the sale of its European division to Peugeot, Chrysler achieved a success second in the contest with its Horizon, which won the 1979 award ahead of one of its main rivals, Fiat Ritmo/Strada. Lancia finally achieved recognition a year later when its stylish new Delta hatchback was voted European Car of the Year.

Ford finally achieved success in the contest when its MK3 Escort, the first of that model line to feature front-wheel drive or a hatchback, sealed the award for 1981, fighting off competition from British Leyland's crucial Austin Metro supermini and the Fiat Panda. A year later, the accolade was perhaps surprisingly won by the Renault 9, which managed to finish ahead of the more widely well regarded Opel Ascona/Vauxhall Cavalier and the MK2 Volkswagen Polo. The 1983 award was won by the Audi 100, which narrowly finished ahead of the slightly smaller and similarly aerodynamic Ford Sierra.

The 1984 award saw two new superminis finish well ahead of the nearest contenders. The Fiat Uno was Fiat's fourth success in the history of the award, finishing slightly ahead of the Peugeot 205. A year later, General Motors finally achieved recognition when its latest version of the Opel Kadett/Vauxhall Astra sealed it. Ford achieved a second victory in the 1986 contest with its new Scorpio/Granada flagship Which unsuccessful in the American market. General Motors made it two victories in three years when its own flagship model, the Opel Omega/Vauxhall Carlton, won the award for 1987.

19 years after the 504 gave Peugeot its first European Car of the Year, the French carmaker finally enjoyed its second triumph in the competition when its mid-range 405 saloon won the 1988 award by a wide margin. A year later, Fiat became the first manufacturer to win the award five times when its ground-breaking new Tipo achieved victory.

Citroën's new XM flagship model won the award for 1990, with its French rival Renault scoring success a year later with the new Clio supermini, which signalled the end for the iconic R5. With the award now nearly 30 years old, Volkswagen finally achieved recognition in 1992 when its MK3 Golf won the award, finishing ahead of two of its most important competitors - the Vauxhall/Opel Astra and Citroën ZX.

A non-European brand - with a British-built product - won the award for the first time for 1993, when the Nissan Micra earned top marks ahead of the Fiat Cinquecento (a car which helped the popularity of city cars in Europe to soar over the next few years) and Renault's new flagship, the Safrane.

Ford achieved a third success in the competition with its Mondeo, successor to the Sierra, winning the award for 1994. Fiat increased its number of victories in the contest to six, when its new Punto supermini won the award for 1995, just as its Uno and 127 ancestors had done many years earlier. Fiat made it seven victories a year later when its Bravo/Brava range pipped the stylish Peugeot 406 to the honour.

Renault's innovative compact MPV, the Scénic, won the ECOTY And Japan Import Car of the Year for 1997, while The Fiat subsidiary Alfa Romeo won the next year's award for the first time with its 156 mid-range sports saloon.

Ford achieved a fourth success in the contest when its boldly-styled Focus won the 1999 award, fighting off competition from the latest Vauxhall/Opel Astra as well as Peugeot's stylish 206 supermini. A year later, a Japanese manufacturer - this time with a Japanese-built product - won the award when the Toyota Yaris Hatchback and Yaris Verso Mini MPV earned top marks in Car of the Year Japan and ECOTY ahead of the boldly-styled Fiat Multipla and the practical Vauxhall/Opel Zafira compact MPV.

Alfa Romeo's modern revival continued when its stylish 147 won the award for 2001, with the next winner being the Peugeot 307. It was another French success for 2003, when the second generation Renault Megane was the winner.

Fiat achieved its eighth success in the contest when its all-new Panda won the 2004 award. Toyota made it two victories from six years when its radical Prius hybrid won the 2005 award. The Renault Clio became the first model to win the award twice when the third generation of the popular supermini won it for 2006, having previously won in 1991.

Ford's stylish and practical S-MAX won the 2007 award, fighting off a close challenge from the Vauxhall/Opel Corsa, earlier versions of which had been largely overlooked by the contest's judges.

Fiat made in nine victories in the contest when it won the 2008 award with the 500 model, a retro-styled take on its iconic small car which had first been launched 50 years earlier. The next award went to a more traditional and mainstream offering, when Vauxhall/Opel won the award for only the third time with its Insignia.

Volkswagen's Polo supermini had been around in several forms since its launch in the mid 1970s, but the all-new version launched in 2009 was the first generation of Polo to win this award, and only the second Volkswagen-badged car ever to win it.

Then came two years of success for electric-powered cars, with the British-built Nissan Leaf and United States-built (Opel) Vauxhall Ampera/Chevrolet Volt winning the 2011 and 2012 award respectively.

The Volkswagen Golf (having previously won in 1992) then joined the Renault Clio with the distinction of two wins in the contest when the MK7 version won the 2013 award. One of the Golf's key rivals, the Peugeot 308, was the next winner. In 2015, was awarded the Volkswagen Passat. In 2016, the Opel/Vauxhall Astra, another key rival to the Golf, became the third automobile to win the award twice, having previously won in 1985.

In 2017 Peugeot won with the fifth time with the crossover 3008.

The 2018 winner announced on 5 March is for a Swedish manufacturer for the first time in the history of the competition, with the Volvo XC40 winning.

 2001-

* The I-Pace received 18 first-place votes, compared to 16 for the A110.

See also

 List of motor vehicle awards
Car of the Year for other similar awards in different countries and by various magazine and institutions.

References

External links
 

Motor vehicle awards
Awards established in 1964
Car
Stern (magazine)
Road transport in Europe